In artificial intelligence and related fields, an argumentation framework is a way to deal with contentious information and draw conclusions from it using formalized arguments.

In an abstract argumentation framework, entry-level information is a set of abstract arguments that, for instance, represent data or a proposition. Conflicts between arguments are represented by a binary relation on the set of arguments. In concrete terms, you represent an argumentation framework with a directed graph such that the nodes are the arguments, and the arrows represent the attack relation.
There exist some extensions of the Dung's framework, like the logic-based argumentation frameworks or the value-based argumentation frameworks.

Abstract argumentation frameworks

Formal framework 
Abstract argumentation frameworks, also called argumentation frameworks à la Dung, are defined formally as a pair:
 A set of abstract elements called arguments, denoted 

Dung defines some notions :
 an argument  is acceptable with respect to  if and only if  defends , that is  such that  such that ,
 a set of arguments  is conflict-free if there is no attack between its arguments, formally : ,

Different semantics of acceptance

Extensions 
To decide if an argument can be accepted or not, or if several arguments can be accepted together, Dung defines several semantics of acceptance that allows, given an argumentation system, sets of arguments (called extensions) to be computed. For instance, given ,
There exists some inclusions between the sets of extensions built with these semantics :
 Every stable extension is preferred,
 Every preferred extension is complete,
 The grounded extension is complete,
 If the system is well-founded (there exists no infinite sequence  such that ), all these semantics coincide—only one extension is grounded, stable, preferred, and complete.

Some other semantics have been defined.

One introduce the notation  to note the set of -extensions of the system .

In the case of the system  in the figure above,  for every Dung's semantic—the system is well-founded.

Labellings 
Labellings are a more expressive way than extensions to express the acceptance of the arguments. Concretely, a labelling is a mapping that associates every argument with a label in (the argument is accepted), out (the argument is rejected), or undec (the argument is undefined—not accepted or refused).
One can also note a labelling as a set of pairs .

Such a mapping does not make sense without additional constraint. The notion of reinstatement labelling guarantees the sense of the mapping.  is a reinstatement labelling on the system  if and only if :
  if and only if  such that 
  if and only if  such that  and 
  if and only if  and 

One can convert every extension into a reinstatement labelling: the arguments of the extension are in, those attacked by an argument of the extension are out, and the others are undec. Conversely, one can build an extension from a reinstatement labelling just by keeping the arguments in. Indeed, Caminada proved that the reinstatement labellings and the complete extensions can be mapped in a bijective way. Moreover, the other Datung's semantics can be associated to some particular sets of reinstatement labellings.

Reinstatement labellings distinguish arguments not accepted because they are attacked by accepted arguments from undefined arguments—that is, those that are not defended cannot defend themselves. An argument is undec if it is attacked by at least another undec. If it is attacked only  by arguments out, it must be in, and if it is attacked some argument in, then it is out.

Inference from an argumentation system 
In the general case when several extensions are computed for a given semantic , the agent that reasons from the system can use several mechanisms to infer information:
 Skeptical inference: the agent accepts an argument only if it belongs to every -extension. In this case, the agent risks deducing too little information (if the intersection of the extensions is empty or has a very small cardinal).

For these two methods to infer information, one can identify the set of accepted arguments, respectively  the set of the arguments credulously accepted under the semantic , and  the set of arguments accepted skeptically under the semantic  (the  can be missed if there is no possible ambiguity about the semantic).

Of course, when there is only one extension (for instance, when the system is well-founded), this problem is very simple: the agent accepts arguments of the unique extension and rejects others.

The same reasoning can be done with labellings that correspond to the chosen semantic : an argument can be accepted if it is in for each labelling and refused if it is out for each labelling, the others being in an undecided state (the status of the arguments can remind the epistemic states of a belief in the AGM framework for dynamic of beliefs).

Equivalence between argumentation frameworks 
There exists several criteria of equivalence between argumentation frameworks. Most of those criteria concern the sets of extensions or the set of accepted arguments.
Formally, given a semantic  :

Other kinds 
The abstract framework of Dung has been instantiated to several particular cases.

Logic-based argumentation frameworks 
In the case of logic-based argumentation frameworks, an argument is not an abstract entity, but a pair, where the first part is a minimal consistent set of formulae enough to prove the formula for the second part of the argument.
Formally, an argument is a pair  such that
  
  
  is a minimal set of  satisfying  where  is a set of formulae used by the agent to reason.

In this case, the attack relation is not given in an explicit way, as a subset of the Cartesian product , but as a property that indicates if an argument attacks another. For instance,
 Relation defeater :  attacks  if and only if  for  
 Relation undercut :  attacks  if and only if  for 
 Relation rebuttal :  attacks  if and only if  is a tautology

Given a particular attack relation, one can build a graph and reason in a similar way to the abstract argumentation frameworks (use of semantics to build extension, skeptical or credulous inference), the difference is that the information inferred from a logic based argumentation framework is a set of formulae (the consequences of the accepted arguments).

Value-based argumentation frameworks 
The value-based argumentation frameworks come from the idea that during an exchange of arguments, some can be stronger than others with respect to a certain value they advance, and so the success of an attack between arguments depends on the difference of these values.

In this framework, an argument  defeats another argument  if and only if
  attacks  in the "standard" meaning:  ;
One remarks that an attack succeeds if both arguments are associated to the same value, or if there is no preference between their respective values.

Assumption-based argumentation frameworks 
In assumption-based argumentation (ABA) frameworks, arguments are defined as a set of rules and attacks are defined in terms of assumptions and contraries.

Formally, an assumption-based argumentation framework is a tuple , where
  , where  is a non-empty set, named the assumptions;
As a consequence of defining an ABA, an argument can be represented in a tree-form.
 The root is labelled by 
 For each node ,
 If  is a leaf node, then  is labelled by either an assumption or by 
 Otherwise,  has  children, labelled by 
  is the set of all assumptions labeling the leave nodes
An argument with claim  supported by a set of assumption  can also be denoted as

See also 

 Argument map
 Argumentation theory
 Defeater
 Diagrammatic reasoning
 Dialogical logic
 Logic and dialectic
 Logic of argumentation
 Knowledge representation and reasoning
 Paraconsistent logic
 Probabilistic argumentation

Notes

References

 

Artificial intelligence